The 2022 PokerGO Tour was the second season of the PokerGO Tour. The season runs for 2022 with the first event beginning on January 5.

Unlike the 2021 season where the top three finishers were awarded prize money, the 2022 season of the PokerGO Tour would culminate with a winner-take-all PGT Championship. Following the conclusion of the all qualifying PokerGO Tour tournaments, the top 21 players will compete in the PGT Championship where starting chips will be based on PokerGO Tour points and the winner will win the $500,000 first-place prize.

The PGT Championship begun on December 21, 2022, with 15 of the 21 eligible players participating. Jason Koon defeated Sean Winter heads-up to win the $500,000 first-place prize to be crowned the PGT Championship winner.

Leaderboard 
The top 21 players following the conclusion of all qualifying PokerGO Tour tournaments will be invited to play in the season-ending PGT Championship. Players will have their starting chips based on how many points they earned during the season, and the PGT Championship will be a winner-take-all with a $500,000 first-place prize set for the winner.

Stephen Chidwick was crowned 2022 PokerGO Tour Player of the Year after amassing 3,412 PGT points which included six wins, 32 cashes, and more than $6.3 million in 2022 PGT season earnings.

The leaderboard is published on the PokerGO Tour website.

Note: Leaderboard is correct as of December 25, 2022.

Schedule 
The full schedule and results for the 2022 PokerGO Tour is published on the website.

(#/#): The first number is the number of PokerGO Tour titles won in 2022. The second number is the total number of PokerGO Tour titles won. Both numbers represent totals as of that point on the PokerGO Tour.

References 

Poker tournaments